Hymns is the sixth album from Christian R&B/Urban, Pop group Out of Eden. It was released in March 2005.

Track list
Fairest Lord Jesus (Barry Graul, Dave Wyatt, Lisa Kimmey, Munster Gesangbuch)
Immortal, Invisible, God Only Wise (Lisa Kimmey, Smith, Walter Chalmers)
I Know Whom I Have Believed (Whittle, Daniel S.)
Praise to the Lord, The Almighty (featuring Tree63) (Joachim Neander, Lisa Kimmey, Stralsund Gesahbuch)
My Faith Has Found a Resting Place (Edmunds, Lidie H., Lisa Kimmey)
God Will Take Care of You (Civilla D. Martin, Lisa Kimmey)
Vision of Love (Lisa Kimmey)
Have Mercy (Lisa Kimmey)
Be Still My Soul (Jean Sibelius, Katherine VonSchlegel, Lisa Kimmey)
Listen (Lisa Kimmey)
Better Is One Day (Prelude) (Lisa Kimmey)
Better Is One Day (Bryant Russell, Dee Dee Holt, Lisa Kimmey)
God Will (Reprise) (Civilla D. Martin, Lisa Kimmey)

Personnel
Bass – Bryant Russell
Drums – Lemar Carter
Guitar – Michael Ripoll 
Horns, Recorded By [Horns], Arranged By [Horns] – John Painter
Keyboards, Piano [Rhodes] – Jammes "Jamba" Castro 
Mastered By – Randy Leroy
Organ – Virgil Startford
Percussion, Tambourine – Otto Price
Producer, Vocals – Lisa Kimmey
Recorded By [Strings] – Baeho Shin
Strings, Arranged By [Strings] – The String Hookup
Vocals – Andrea Baca, Danielle Kimmey

References

Out of Eden albums
2005 albums
Gotee Records albums